Ohleriella is a genus of fungi in the family Delitschiaceae. It has been found in America.

The genus name of Ohleriella is in honour of Heinrich Ohler (1803-1876), who was a German botanist from the Dr. Senckenberg Foundation in Frankfurt. 

The genus was circumscribed by Franklin Sumner Earle in Bull. New York Bot. Gard. vol.2 on page 349 in 1902.

Species
As accepted by GBIF;
 Ohleriella neomexicana 
 Ohleriella nudilignae

References

External links
Index Fungorum

Pleosporales